The Men's 3m Synchronized Springboard event at the 2010 South American Games was held on March 20 at 15:30.

Medalists

Results

References
Summary

3m synchro M